Lego Harry Potter is a Lego theme based on the films of the Harry Potter series. It is licensed from Warner Bros. Lego models of important scenes, vehicles and characters were made for the first six films and all of the published books. The first sets appeared in 2001, to coincide with the release of the first film, Harry Potter and the Philosopher's Stone. Subsequent sets were released alongside the new films, until Harry Potter and the Order of the Phoenix. The line then went dormant for three years, with sets being released in 2010 and 2011. In 2018, it was announced that more sets based on the Harry Potter franchise would be released, including new sets based on Fantastic Beasts and Where to Find Them and its sequel, Fantastic Beasts: The Crimes of Grindelwald.

Overview
The main focus of the line is Harry Potter's first year at Hogwarts School of Witchcraft and Wizardry as he discovers that he is a famous wizard and begins his education. Later on, sets based on other installments and spin-offs would be produced too.

In October 2021, Matthew Lewis, who portrayed Neville Longbottom in the Harry Potter films, recreated his favorite scenes to celebrate 20 Years of Movie Magic with Lego Harry Potter.

In July 2022, Lego Con hosts Joel McHale and Vick Hope build their own Lego Hogwarts version using building tips from Lego Harry Potter designer, Marcos Bessa. Evanna Lynch, who portrayed Luna Lovegood in the Harry Potter films, she explores on a magical adventure through Warner Bros. Studio Tour London – The Making of Harry Potter and how they inspired the current Lego Harry Potter sets.

History
In January 2004, Lego owner and CEO Kjeld Kirk Kristiansen announced a change in direction for the company, which at the time was facing a DKK 1.4 billion loss, and that the company would focus on core products and not "big, movie-related IPs such as Harry Potter". A week later, the company clarified that this did not mean any immediate "radical changes", and that the Harry Potter theme would continue. However, the theme was discontinued after 2007 for a time.

In June 2009, it was officially announced by Lego that a video game, Lego Harry Potter: Years 1–4, was in production and released in June 2010. Lego Harry Potter: Years 5–7 was released in November 2011.

Warner Bros. and Lego announced on February 12, 2010, that six sets including Hogwarts Castle (set number: 4842), Hagrid's Hut (set number: 4738), The Burrow (set number: 4840), Hogwarts Express (set number: 4841), Dobby's Release (set number: 4736) and Quidditch Match (set number: 4737) would be released in October 2010. These sets have newly decorated mini-figures and animals including Luna Lovegood, Bellatrix Lestrange, new owls and new pigs.  Also announced was a Lego Harry Potter board game that was made available in August. In 2013, The Lego Group discontinued Lego Harry Potter sets. However, a Lego Dimensions add-on pack featuring Harry Potter and Voldemort was scheduled to be released on 27 September 2016.

In 2018, it was announced that more sets based on the Harry Potter Universe would be released, starting with a set based on the Great Hall.

On 28 April 2020, it was announced that more sets based on the Harry Potter Universe would be released in August 2020.

On 31 August 2020, Lego Group announced that the newest set Diagon Alley (set number: 75978) were be released in next month.

During the post-2018 reboot wave, Lego has also released two series of Lego Harry Potter Collectible Minifigures under the Lego Minifigures theme.

In 2021, it was announced that Harry Potter Hogwarts Crests (set number: 31201) would be released on 1 January 2021 as a sub-brand of the Lego Art theme. Lego has also released more sets in the summer of 2021 to commemorate the 20th anniversary of Lego Harry Potter. More sets are being released in 2022

Construction sets

Harry Potter and the Philosopher's Stone (2001–2002)

The first film saw the largest number of sets, with fourteen being made in total. Initially, only eleven were produced, however three more were released the next year.

Harry Potter and the Chamber of Secrets (2002–2003)

Ten sets were produced based on the second film in the series, two of which were released the year after the second film. These sets were designed to be combined with the sets from the first film.

Harry Potter and the Prisoner of Azkaban (2004)

The third film saw eleven sets released, including the first Lego Harry Potter mini set. In addition, the minifigures became fleshed toned, following Lego universal change for licensed characters.

Mini-sets (Small Polybags)

Harry Potter and the Goblet of Fire (2005)

Only four sets based on the fourth film were released. The Harry Potter minifigure headpiece was redesigned in this series.

Harry Potter and the Order of the Phoenix (2007)

Only one set was produced based on the fifth film foreshadowing the theme's assumed retirement. This was the last Harry Potter themed set until 2010.

Revival Series (2010)
Lego revived the Harry Potter theme after a three-year gap from previous set released in 2007. These new sets were released October 1, 2010 within the UK. All sets are remakes of previous ones with the exception of one new set, The Burrow, which is based on a scene from Harry Potter and the Half-Blood Prince.

2011
Lego released four main sets in 2011. Diagon Alley was released in January, while the other three sets were released on June 1, 2011, around the time of the cinema release of Harry Potter and the Deathly Hallows – Part 2. However, the Trolley, The Lab and the Mini Hogwarts Express were all promotional sets that were released in different countries at different times, which were either being given away with newspaper offers, the purchase of Diagon Alley from the Lego Shop and also with the pre-order of the game, Lego Harry Potter: Years 5–7.

2016
Lego has produced a Harry Potter-themed Lego Dimensions "team pack" with a scheduled release date of 27 September 2016 in the United States. This add-on pack includes Harry Potter and Voldemort minifigs that are largely similar to the 2010/2011 versions. Key differences include a different hairpiece for Harry Potter and a brown wand instead of a white one for Voldemort. The add-on pack also includes small versions of the Weasleys' flying car and the Hogwarts Express engine. This "team pack" number is 71247. An additional "fun pack" featuring Hermione Granger and Buckbeak (71348) was released on May 9, 2017. Add-on packs based on Fantastic Beasts & Where to Find Them are set for release alongside the film on 18 November 2016; these include a "story pack" containing Newt Scamander, a Niffler and a MACUSA model (71253), and a "fun pack" containing Tina Goldstein and a Swooping Evil (71257).

2018 (Focused on the Philosopher's Stone and the Chamber of Secrets) 
Harry Potter sets were released on July 1, 2018, including a set based on the Great Hall in the first two movies. The theme also includes sets based on the "Fantastic Beasts" movies. Additionally, on September 1, a 6000-piece microscale Hogwarts D2C set was released for purchase.

2019 (Focused on the Prisoner of Azkaban and the Goblet of Fire)
Harry Potter sets were released on June 1, 2019.

2020 (Focused on the Order of the Phoenix and the Half-Blood Prince)
Harry Potter sets were released in Europe on June 1, 2020, and in North America on August 24, 2020.

2021 
On January 1, 2021, Lego released the Harry Potter Hogwarts Crests (31201) under the Lego Art theme.

Hogwarts Moment 
On January 1, 2021, 4 sets were released under the Hogwarts Moment subtheme.

20th Anniversary (Focused on the Philosopher's Stone and the Chamber of Secrets) 
On April 16, 2021, Lego announced the upcoming release of new Harry Potter sets from June 1, 2021, to mark the 20th anniversary of Lego Harry Potter. Selected sets will also include an exclusive golden minifigure to mark the celebration. In addition, collectible Wizard Cards based on the Chocolate Frog Cards featuring Harry Potter Universe characters were also randomly packed into the sets.

2022

Hogwarts Moment 
On March 1, 2022, 2 additional sets were released under the Hogwarts Moment subtheme.

Throughout the year, additional sets based on various movies from the franchise were released.
Additionally, on August 31, a 5129-piece Hogwarts Express D2C display set was released for purchase.

Lego Minifigures 
Since the 2018 return of the theme, Lego has released two sets of Harry Potter Collectible Minifigures Series, the first in 2018 and another in 2020.

Video games

Lego Creator: Harry Potter
Two sandbox games were released as part of the Lego Creator series: Lego Creator: Harry Potter (2001) and Creator: Harry Potter and the Chamber of Secrets (2002). Both games allow the player to build their own sets in a virtual world based on the Lego Harry Potter theme, and interact with their constructions by taking control over minifigures or creatures that have been added to the world by the player.

Lego Harry Potter Collection

In June 2009, it was officially announced by Lego that a video game, Lego Harry Potter: Years 1–4, was in production and released in June 2010. Lego Harry Potter: Years 5–7 was released in November 2011. The video games were released for the PlayStation 4 on October 21, 2016, as part of the Lego Harry Potter Collection, and was also released for the Xbox One and Nintendo Switch on October 30, 2018.

Lego Dimensions 

The crossover toys-to-life game Lego Dimensions developed by Traveller's Tales features content based on both the original Harry Potter and Fantastic Beasts and Where to Find Them. A "team pack" includes an additional level that recreates the events of the original film and adds Harry Potter and Lord Voldemort as a playable characters. A "story pack" offers an extended six-level story campaign retelling the events of the Fantastic Beasts and Where to Find Them, and includes Newt Scamander as a playable character. Additional "fun packs" add Tina Goldstein and Hermione Granger as playable characters.

Other merchandise
In 2022, The Lego Harry Potter brand has also produced Plush Toy Collection.

Reception
In 2020, The Lego Group reported that the Lego Technic, Lego Star Wars, Lego Classic, Lego Disney Princess, Lego Harry Potter and Lego Speed Champions, "The strong results are due to our incredible team," and that these themes had helped to push revenue for the first half of 2020 grow 7% to DKK 15.7 billion compared with the same period in 2019.

In 2019, Harry Potter and Hedwig (set number: 41615) was listed as one of The Top Ten best-selling Harry Potter toys in the UK for the 12 months ending May 2019.

In 2019, Hogwarts Great Hall (set number: 75954), Hogwarts Express (set number: 75955), Hogwarts Whomping Willow (set number: 75953), Quidditch Match (set number: 75956) and Harry Potter and Hedwig (set number: 41615) were listed on The Top Ten best-selling Harry Potter toys in the UK for the 12 months ending May 2019.

In March 2022, The Lego Group reported that the Lego City, Lego Technic, Lego Creator Expert, Lego Harry Potter and Lego Star Wars themes had earned for the full year of 2021. Revenue for the year grew 27 percent versus 2020 to DKK 55.3 billion and consumer sales grew 22 percent over the same period, outpacing the toy industry and driving market share growth globally and in largest markets.

On 28 September 2022, The Lego Group reported that the Lego Star Wars, Lego Technic, Lego Icons (formerly Creator Expert), Lego City, Lego Harry Potter and Lego Friends themes had earned for the six months ending 30 June 2022. Revenue for the period grew 17 percent to DKK 27.0 billion compared with the same period in 2021, driven by strong demand. Consumer sales grew 13 percent, significantly ahead of the toy industry, contributing to global market share growth.

In February 2023, Hogwarts Castle (set number: 71043) was listed on "The biggest Lego sets of all time" by Lego fansite Brick Fanatics.

In March 2023, The Lego Group reported that the Lego City, Lego Technic, Lego Icons, Lego Harry Potter and Lego Star Wars themes had earned for the full year of 2022. Revenue for the year grew 17 percent to DKK 64.6 billion and consumer sales grew 12 percent in 2022, achieving growth in all major market groups with especially strong performance in the Americas and Western Europe.

Awards and nominations
In 2001, Hogwarts Castle (set number: 4709) was awarded "Toy of the Year" and also "Activity Toy of the Year" by the Toy Association.

In 2010, Hogwarts Game was awarded "DreamToys" in the Games category by the Toy Retailers Association.

In 2018, Hogwarts Express and Great Hall Harry Potter were awarded "DreamToys" in the It's Showtime category by the Toy Retailers Association.

In 2019, Knight Bus was awarded "DreamToys" in the Movie Magic category by the Toy Retailers Association.

In 2019, Lego Harry Potter and Fantastic Beasts Minifigure Series was awarded "Toy of the Year" and also "Collectible of the Year" by the Toy Association. Also included, Hogwarts Castle (set number: 71043) was awarded "Toy of the Year" and also "Specialty Toy of the Year" by the Toy Association.

In 2020, Hedwig (set number: 75979) was awarded "DreamToys" in the Licensed To Thrill category by the Toy Retailers Association.

In 2021, Hogwarts Chamber of Secrets (set number: 76389) was awarded "DreamToys" in the Licensed To Thrill category by the Toy Retailers Association.

In 2022, The Ministry of Magic (set number: 76403) was awarded "DreamToys" in the Film & TV Favourites category by the Toy Retailers Association.

See also
Lego Art
Lego DOTS
Lego Games
Lego Minifigures (theme)

Notes

References

Bibliography 
 Lego Harry Potter: Building the Magical World. Authored by Elizabeth Dowsett. Published by Dorling Kindersley, 2011. 
 Lego Harry Potter Magical Adventures Ultimate Sticker Book. Published by Dorling Kindersley, 2011. 
 The Harry Potter Lego Minifigure Catalog : 1st Edition. Authored by Christoph Bartneck. Published by Createspace Independent Publishing Platform, 2012. 
 Lego(r) Harry Potter: Characters of the Magical World. Published by Dorling Kindersley, 2012. 
 Witches and Wizards Character Handbook (LEGO Harry Potter). Authored by Samantha Swank. Published by Scholastic Inc., 2018. 
 Harry Potter Build Your Own Adventure. Authored by Elizabeth Dowsett. Published by Dorling Kindersley, 2019. 
 Harry Potter The Magical Guide to the Wizarding World. Authored by Rosie Peet. Published by Dorling Kindersley, 2019. 
 Lego Harry Potter Build Your Own Adventure: With Lego Harry Potter Minifigure and Exclusive Model. Authored by Elizabeth Dowsett. Published by Dorling Kindersley, 2019. 
 Lego Harry Potter: A Magical Search and Find Adventure (Activity Book with Snape Minifigure). Authored by Ameet Studio. Published by Scholastic Inc., 2019. 
 Lego Harry Potter: Back to Hogwarts Activity Book + minifigure. Authored by Ameet Studio. Published by Scholastic Inc., 2019. 
 Harry Potter Magical Treasury: A Visual Guide to the Wizarding World. Authored by Elizabeth Dowsett. Published by Dorling Kindersley, 2020. 
 Lego Harry Potter Hogwarts Adventures. Published by Centum Books, 2020. 
 Adventure with Buckbeak! (Lego Harry Potter: Activity Book with Minifigure). Authored by Ameet Studio. Published by Scholastic Inc., 2020. 
 Lego (R) Harry Potter (TM) Magical Treasury : A Visual Guide to the Wizarding World (with exclusive Tom Riddle minifigure). Authored by Elizabeth Dowsett. Published by Dorling Kindersley, 2020.

External links 
Lego Harry Potter at Lego.com

Harry Potter
Harry Potter games
Products introduced in 2001
Action-adventure video games by series
Video game franchises introduced in 2010